Birthplace of Gabriele D'Annunzio Museum (Museo Casa Natale di Gabriele D'Annunzio in Italian)  is a historic house museum in Pescara, Abruzzo.

History

Collection

Notes

External links

Pescara
Museums in Abruzzo
Historic house museums in Italy